Laura Vernizzi (born 15 September 1985 in Como) is a former Italian rhythmic gymnast.

Biography
She won the silver medal in the competition of rhythmic gymnastics group at Athens Olympics in 2004.

Olympic results

Honours
 Officer: Ufficiale Ordine al Merito della Repubblica Italiana: 27 September 2004

See also
Italy at the 2004 Summer Olympics - Medalists

References

External links
 
 
 Gymnast profile at the FIG web site

1985 births
Living people
Olympic gymnasts of Italy
Olympic medalists in gymnastics
Olympic silver medalists for Italy
Italian rhythmic gymnasts
Gymnasts at the 2004 Summer Olympics
Medalists at the 2004 Summer Olympics
Competitors at the 2001 World Games
21st-century Italian women